Leptocaris is a genus of copepods in the family Darcythompsoniidae. One species, the Mexican endemic L. stromatolicolus, is included on the IUCN Red List as a vulnerable species. The genus contains the following species:

Leptocaris adriatica Petkovski, 1955
Leptocaris armatus Lang, 1965
Leptocaris azoricus Kunz, 1983
Leptocaris biscayensis (Noodt, 1955)
Leptocaris brevicornis (van Douwe, 1905)
Leptocaris canariensis Lang, 1965
Leptocaris doughertyi Lang, 1965
Leptocaris echinatus Fiers, 1986
Leptocaris elishevae (Por, 1968)
Leptocaris glaber Fiers, 1986
Leptocaris gurneyi (Nicholls, 1944)
Leptocaris ignavus (Noodt, 1953)
Leptocaris igneus Cottarelli & Baldari, 1982
Leptocaris insularis (Noodt, 1958)
Leptocaris islandica Apostolov, 2007
Leptocaris itoi Kunz, 1994
Leptocaris kunzi Fleeger & Clark, 1980
Leptocaris mangalis Por, 1983
Leptocaris marinus (Por, 1964)
Leptocaris minima (Noodt, 1958)
Leptocaris minimus (Jakobi, 1954)
Leptocaris minutus T. Scott, 1899
Leptocaris mucronatus Fiers, 1986
Leptocaris noodti Kunz, 1994
Leptocaris pori Lang, 1965
Leptocaris ryukyuensis Song et al., 2012 
Leptocaris sibirica Borutsky, 1952
Leptocaris stromatolicolus Zamudio-Valdés & Reid, 1990
Leptocaris trisetosus (Kunz, 1935)
Leptocaris vermiculatus (Oliveira, 1957)

References

Harpacticoida
Taxonomy articles created by Polbot